Zakharovo is the name of several  rural localities in Russia.

Altai Krai
As of 2010, two rural localities in Altai Krai bear this name:
Zakharovo, Rubtsovsky District, Altai Krai, a selo in Bezrukavsky Selsoviet of Rubtsovsky District
Zakharovo, Zalesovsky District, Altai Krai, a selo in Dumchevsky Selsoviet of Zalesovsky District

Arkhangelsk Oblast
As of 2010, three rural localities in Arkhangelsk Oblast bear this name:
Zakharovo, Lisestrovsky Selsoviet, Primorsky District, Arkhangelsk Oblast, a village in Lisestrovsky Selsoviet of Primorsky District
Zakharovo, Voznesensky Selsoviet, Primorsky District, Arkhangelsk Oblast, a village in Voznesensky Selsoviet of Primorsky District
Zakharovo, Velsky District, Arkhangelsk Oblast, a village in Poponavolotsky Selsoviet of Velsky District

Belgorod Oblast
As of 2010, one rural locality in Belgorod Oblast bears this name:
Zakharovo, Belgorod Oblast, a selo in Chernyansky District

Bryansk Oblast
As of 2010, one rural locality in Bryansk Oblast bears this name:
Zakharovo, Bryansk Oblast, a village in Lopandinsky Selsoviet of Komarichsky District

Ivanovo Oblast
As of 2010, four rural localities in Ivanovo Oblast bear this name:
Zakharovo (Timiryazevskoye Rural Settlement), Lukhsky District, Ivanovo Oblast, a village in Lukhsky District; municipally, a part of Timiryazevskoye Rural Settlement of that district
Zakharovo (Ryabovskoye Rural Settlement), Lukhsky District, Ivanovo Oblast, a village in Lukhsky District; municipally, a part of Ryabovskoye Rural Settlement of that district
Zakharovo, Shuysky District, Ivanovo Oblast, a village in Shuysky District
Zakharovo, Teykovsky District, Ivanovo Oblast, a village in Teykovsky District

Kaluga Oblast
As of 2010, three rural localities in Kaluga Oblast bear this name:
Zakharovo, Dzerzhinsky District, Kaluga Oblast, a village in Dzerzhinsky District
Zakharovo, Iznoskovsky District, Kaluga Oblast, a village in Iznoskovsky District
Zakharovo, Maloyaroslavetsky District, Kaluga Oblast, a village in Maloyaroslavetsky District

Kirov Oblast
As of 2010, one rural locality in Kirov Oblast bears this name:
Zakharovo, Kirov Oblast, a village in Kaysky Rural Okrug of Verkhnekamsky District

Komi Republic
As of 2010, one rural locality in the Komi Republic bears this name:
Zakharovo, Komi Republic, a village in Yb Selo Administrative Territory of Syktyvdinsky District

Kostroma Oblast
As of 2010, six rural localities in Kostroma Oblast bear this name:
Zakharovo, Buysky District, Kostroma Oblast, a village in Tsentralnoye Settlement of Buysky District
Zakharovo, Chukhlomsky District, Kostroma Oblast, a village in Chukhlomskoye Settlement of Chukhlomsky District
Zakharovo, Baksheyevskoye Settlement, Kostromskoy District, Kostroma Oblast, a village in Baksheyevskoye Settlement of Kostromskoy District
Zakharovo, Shungenskoye Settlement, Kostromskoy District, Kostroma Oblast, a village in Shungenskoye Settlement of Kostromskoy District
Zakharovo, Krasnoselsky District, Kostroma Oblast, a village in Zakharovskoye Settlement of Krasnoselsky District
Zakharovo, Nerekhtsky District, Kostroma Oblast, a village in Yemsnenskoye Settlement of Nerekhtsky District

Kursk Oblast
As of 2010, one rural locality in Kursk Oblast bears this name:
Zakharovo, Kursk Oblast, a village in Buninsky Selsoviet of Solntsevsky District

Mari El Republic
As of 2010, one rural locality in the Mari El Republic bears this name:
Zakharovo, Mari El Republic, a village in Chendemerovsky Rural Okrug of Sernursky District

Moscow Oblast
As of 2010, eight rural localities in Moscow Oblast bear this name:
Zakharovo, Istrinsky District, Moscow Oblast, a village in Obushkovskoye Rural Settlement of Istrinsky District
Zakharovo, Petrovskoye Rural Settlement, Klinsky District, Moscow Oblast, a village in Petrovskoye Rural Settlement of Klinsky District
Zakharovo, Klin Town, Klinsky District, Moscow Oblast, a village under the administrative jurisdiction of the Town of Klin in Klinsky District
Zakharovo, Odintsovsky District, Moscow Oblast, a village in Zakharovskoye Rural Settlement of Odintsovsky District
Zakharovo, Rybolovskoye Rural Settlement, Ramensky District, Moscow Oblast, a village in Rybolovskoye Rural Settlement of Ramensky District
Zakharovo, Kratovo Suburban Settlement, Ramensky District, Moscow Oblast, a village under the administrative jurisdiction of the suburban settlement of Kratovo in Ramensky District
Zakharovo, Stupinsky District, Moscow Oblast, a village in Leontyevskoye Rural Settlement of Stupinsky District
Zakharovo, Yegoryevsky District, Moscow Oblast, a village under the administrative jurisdiction of the Town of Yegoryevsk in Yegoryevsky District

Nizhny Novgorod Oblast
As of 2010, six rural localities in Nizhny Novgorod Oblast bear this name:
Zakharovo, Bor, Nizhny Novgorod Oblast, a village in Lindovsky Selsoviet of the town of oblast significance of Bor
Zakharovo, Semyonov, Nizhny Novgorod Oblast, a village in Shaldezhsky Selsoviet of the town of oblast significance of Semyonov
Zakharovo, Pavlovsky District, Nizhny Novgorod Oblast, a village in Ababkovsky Selsoviet of Pavlovsky District
Zakharovo, Sokolsky District, Nizhny Novgorod Oblast, a village in Volzhsky Selsoviet of Sokolsky District
Zakharovo, Sosnovsky District, Nizhny Novgorod Oblast, a village in Yakovsky Selsoviet of Sosnovsky District
Zakharovo, Tonkinsky District, Nizhny Novgorod Oblast, a village in Bolshesodomovsky Selsoviet of Tonkinsky District

Novgorod Oblast
As of 2010, one rural locality in Novgorod Oblast bears this name:
Zakharovo, Novgorod Oblast, a village in Burginskoye Settlement of Malovishersky District

Perm Krai
As of 2010, one rural locality in Perm Krai bears this name:
Zakharovo, Perm Krai, a village under the administrative jurisdiction of the town of krai significance of Lysva

Pskov Oblast
As of 2010, two rural localities in Pskov Oblast bear this name:
Zakharovo, Novosokolnichesky District, Pskov Oblast, a village in Novosokolnichesky District
Zakharovo, Velikoluksky District, Pskov Oblast, a village in Velikoluksky District

Ryazan Oblast
As of 2010, three rural localities in Ryazan Oblast bear this name:
Zakharovo, Kasimovsky District, Ryazan Oblast, a village in Tokarevsky Rural Okrug of Kasimovsky District
Zakharovo, Klepikovsky District, Ryazan Oblast, a village in Oskinsky Rural Okrug of Klepikovsky District
Zakharovo, Zakharovsky District, Ryazan Oblast, a selo in Zakharovsky Rural Okrug of Zakharovsky District

Tver Oblast
As of 2010, ten rural localities in Tver Oblast bear this name:
Zakharovo, Bezhetsky District, Tver Oblast, a village in Fralevskoye Rural Settlement of Bezhetsky District
Zakharovo, Kalininsky District, Tver Oblast, a village in Verkhnevolzhskoye Rural Settlement of Kalininsky District
Zakharovo, Kashinsky District, Tver Oblast, a village in Unitskoye Rural Settlement of Kashinsky District
Zakharovo, Konakovsky District, Tver Oblast, a village in Ruchyevskoye Rural Settlement of Konakovsky District
Zakharovo, Likhoslavlsky District, Tver Oblast, a village in Kavskoye Rural Settlement of Likhoslavlsky District
Zakharovo, Uspenskoye Rural Settlement, Rzhevsky District, Tver Oblast, a village in Uspenskoye Rural Settlement of Rzhevsky District
Zakharovo, Yesinka Rural Settlement, Rzhevsky District, Tver Oblast, a village in Yesinka Rural Settlement of Rzhevsky District
Zakharovo, Selizharovsky District, Tver Oblast, a village in Zakharovskoye Rural Settlement of Selizharovsky District
Zakharovo, Spirovsky District, Tver Oblast, a village in Kozlovskoye Rural Settlement of Spirovsky District
Zakharovo, Udomelsky District, Tver Oblast, a village in Mstinskoye Rural Settlement of Udomelsky District

Udmurt Republic
As of 2010, one rural locality in the Udmurt Republic bears this name:
Zakharovo, Udmurt Republic, a village in Iyulsky Selsoviet of Votkinsky District

Vladimir Oblast
As of 2010, five rural localities in Vladimir Oblast bear this name:
Zakharovo, Gus-Khrustalny District, Vladimir Oblast, a village in Gus-Khrustalny District
Zakharovo, Kirzhachsky District, Vladimir Oblast, a village in Kirzhachsky District
Zakharovo, Muromsky District, Vladimir Oblast, a village in Muromsky District
Zakharovo, Selivanovsky District, Vladimir Oblast, a selo in Selivanovsky District
Zakharovo, Sudogodsky District, Vladimir Oblast, a village in Sudogodsky District

Vologda Oblast
As of 2010, nine rural localities in Vologda Oblast bear this name:
Zakharovo, Dmitriyevsky Selsoviet, Cherepovetsky District, Vologda Oblast, a village in Dmitriyevsky Selsoviet of Cherepovetsky District
Zakharovo, Musorsky Selsoviet, Cherepovetsky District, Vologda Oblast, a village in Musorsky Selsoviet of Cherepovetsky District
Zakharovo, Gryazovetsky District, Vologda Oblast, a village in Minkinsky Selsoviet of Gryazovetsky District
Zakharovo, Kichmengsko-Gorodetsky District, Vologda Oblast, a village in Zakharovsky Selsoviet of Kichmengsko-Gorodetsky District
Zakharovo, Baydarovsky Selsoviet, Nikolsky District, Vologda Oblast, a village in Baydarovsky Selsoviet of Nikolsky District
Zakharovo, Vakhnevsky Selsoviet, Nikolsky District, Vologda Oblast, a village in Vakhnevsky Selsoviet of Nikolsky District
Zakharovo, Sokolsky District, Vologda Oblast, a village in Arkhangelsky Selsoviet of Sokolsky District
Zakharovo, Markovsky Selsoviet, Vologodsky District, Vologda Oblast, a village in Markovsky Selsoviet of Vologodsky District
Zakharovo, Spassky Selsoviet, Vologodsky District, Vologda Oblast, a village in Spassky Selsoviet of Vologodsky District

Yaroslavl Oblast
As of 2010, six rural localities in Yaroslavl Oblast bear this name:
Zakharovo, Breytovsky District, Yaroslavl Oblast, a village in Sevastyantsevsky Rural Okrug of Breytovsky District
Zakharovo, Dmitriyevsky Rural Okrug, Danilovsky District, Yaroslavl Oblast, a village in Dmitriyevsky Rural Okrug of Danilovsky District
Zakharovo, Vakhtinsky Rural Okrug, Danilovsky District, Yaroslavl Oblast, a village in Vakhtinsky Rural Okrug of Danilovsky District
Zakharovo, Pereslavsky District, Yaroslavl Oblast, a village in Andrianovsky Rural Okrug of Pereslavsky District
Zakharovo, Pervomaysky District, Yaroslavl Oblast, a village in Kolkinsky Rural Okrug of Pervomaysky District
Zakharovo, Rostovsky District, Yaroslavl Oblast, a village in Perovsky Rural Okrug of Rostovsky District

Zabaykalsky Krai
As of 2010, one rural locality in Zabaykalsky Krai bears this name:
Zakharovo, Zabaykalsky Krai, a selo in Krasnochikoysky District

See also
Zakharov (rural locality) (Zakharova), several rural localities in Russia